Expert Labs is a non-profit technology incubator intended to aid government access expertise from interested members of the public. Part of the American Association for the Advancement of Science, it was formed in November 2009, following discussions with the White House Office of Science & Technology Policy. Expert Labs is directed by longtime blogger and technology evangelist Anil Dash.  Initial funding of US$500,000 is from the MacArthur Foundation.

Gina Trapani joined as a Product Director in February 2010.  Her private project ThinkTank has since been renamed ThinkUp and is now funded by Expert Labs.

References

External links
 

Non-profit organizations based in Washington, D.C.
Information technology consulting firms of the United States
Organizations established in 2009
2009 establishments in Washington, D.C.